IFD may stand for:

In culture:
 I Fight Dragons, a Chicago-based  band
 Independent Film Distributors, UK

In technology:
 I-Frame Delay, in MPEG video
 Image File Directory, in the Exchangeable image file format (Exif)

In organisations:
 Indianapolis Fire Department, Indiana, US
 Information Flow Diagram

Other uses:
 Ideal free distribution, of animals around resources
 Ilford railway station, England, station code
 Indentation force deflection, test of memory foam